Born of the Sea is a 2003 horror novel by Victor Kelleher. It follows the story of Madeleine Sauvage, Frankenstein's bride from Mary Shelley's story, if she wasn't destroyed and laying in the bottom of the sea and goes out in search of her creator.

Background
Born of the Sea was first published in Australia in 2003 by Viking Press in paperback format. It won the 2003 Aurealis Award for best horror novel.

References

2003 Australian novels
2000s horror novels
Aurealis Award-winning works
Australian horror novels
Viking Press books